László Mihály Vincze (born 19 February 1952) is a Hungarian educator and politician, member of the National Assembly (MP) for Csongrád (Csongrád County Constituency IV) from 1998 to 2014.

He joined the Independent Smallholders, Agrarian Workers and Civic Party (FKGP) in 1989, where he served first as organizing secretary and later, from 1996, as president of the party's Csongrád branch. Based on the election coalition pact signed on 19 December 2001 between Fidesz and the Civic Association of Smallholders, he ran for the Csongrád Constituency again in the 2002 parliamentary election as candidate of Fidesz, and retained his mandate in the second round held on 21 April 2002. He was elected recorder of Parliament on 15 May 2002.

References

1952 births
Living people
Hungarian educators
Independent Smallholders, Agrarian Workers and Civic Party politicians
Members of the National Assembly of Hungary (1998–2002)
Members of the National Assembly of Hungary (2002–2006)
Members of the National Assembly of Hungary (2006–2010)
Members of the National Assembly of Hungary (2010–2014)
People from Csongrád